Telegraph Hill (elev. ) is a hill and surrounding neighborhood in San Francisco, California. It is one of San Francisco's 44 hills, and one of its original "Seven Hills".

Location
The San Francisco Chronicle defines the Chinatown, North Beach, and Telegraph Hill areas as bounded by Sacramento Street, Taylor Street, Bay Street, and the water.

The neighborhood is bounded by Vallejo Street to the south, Sansome Street to the east, Francisco Street to the north and Powell Street and Columbus Avenue to the west, where the northwestern corner of Telegraph Hill overlaps with the North Beach neighborhood.

History
Originally named Loma Alta ("High Hill") by the Spaniards, the hill was then familiarly known as Goat Hill by the early San Franciscans and became the neighborhood of choice for many Irish immigrants.
From 1825 through 1847, the area between Sansome and Battery, Broadway and Vallejo streets was used as a burial ground for foreign non-Catholic seamen.

The hill owes its name to a semaphore, a windmill-like structure erected in September 1849, for the purpose of signaling to the rest of the city the nature of the ships entering the Golden Gate. Atop the newly built house, the marine telegraph consisted of a pole with two raisable arms that could form various configurations, each corresponding to a specific meaning: steamer, sailing boat, etc. The information was used by observers operating for financiers, merchants, wholesalers and speculators. Knowing the nature of the cargo carried by the ship they could predict the upcoming (generally lower) local prices for those goods and commodities carried. Those who did not have advance information on the cargo might pay a too-high price from a merchant unloading his stock of a commodity—a price that was about to drop. On October 18, 1850, the ship Oregon signaled to the hill as it was entering the Golden Gate the news of California's recently acquired statehood.

The pole-and-arm signals on the Telegraph Hill semaphore became so well known to townspeople of San Francisco that, according to one story, during a play in a San Francisco theater, an actor held his arms aloft and cried, "Oh God, what does this mean?", prompting a rogue in the gallery to shout, "Sidewheel steamer!", which brought down the house.

Sailing ships brought cargo to San Francisco but needed ballast when leaving. Rocks for ballast were quarried from the bay side of Telegraph Hill. Exposed rock from this quarrying is still visible from the Filbert Steps and from Broadway, where there was a large landslide on February 27, 2007, that damaged property and forced the evacuation of many residents.

In September 1853, the first telegraph in California, which extended eight miles to Point Lobos, San Francisco, was set up on the hill and replaced the semaphore, therefore giving the hill the name of "Telegraph Hill." This telegraph was known as the Marine Telegraph Station, and was destroyed by a storm in 1870.

In 1876, the hilltop land of the original Marine Telegraph Station was purchased by George Hearst, who donated it to the city under the stipulation that the land be dubbed as the Pioneer Park. In 1932–1933, Coit Tower was built where the semaphore and telegraph once stood. Telegraph Hill retained its name and is now registered as California Historical Landmark #91, with a bronze plaque in the lobby of Coit Tower marking the location of the original signal station.

In the 1920s, Telegraph Hill became, along with adjacent North Beach, a destination for poets and bohemian intellectuals, dreaming of turning it into a West Coast West Village.

Attractions and characteristics
Telegraph Hill is primarily a residential area, much quieter than adjoining North Beach with its bustling cafés and nightlife. Aside from Coit Tower, it is well known for its gardens flowing down the nearly 400 wooden steps of Filbert Street steps down to Levi's Plaza.

Filbert steps

The Filbert Street Steps, consisting of about 400 wooden steps that descend the east slope of Telegraph Hill connect two segments of Filbert Street. The steps pass the gardens of houses on the hill, and run through the Grace Marchant Garden, which resident Grace Marchant started in 1949 and is now tended to and paid for by the residents of the "street." From there, the steps run down to an eastern stub of Filbert Street and the walkway through the plaza to The Embarcadero. Many houses in this residential neighborhood are accessible only from the steps. As on paved streets, several fire hydrants and a solitary parking meter are located along the steps.

Parrots

Today Telegraph Hill is known for supporting a flock of feral parrots, primarily red-masked parakeets (Aratinga erythrogenys), descended from escaped or released pets. The flock was popularized by a book and subsequent documentary (2003), both titled The Wild Parrots of Telegraph Hill.

The birds, known in the bird trade as cherry-headed conures, are native to Peru and Ecuador. They have established a breeding colony with the support of some residents, as reported in the film The Wild Parrots of Telegraph Hill, and through the help of volunteers with Mickaboo Companion Bird Rescue. They range widely, including along The Embarcadero and in the Presidio.

A controversial San Francisco city ordinance that prohibits the feeding of parrots in public spaces passed on June 5, 2007. The feeding ban was championed by Mark Bittner, the birds' most outspoken supporter who fed them for years and wrote the book The Wild Parrots of Telegraph Hill. Other local conservationists also supported the ban, though some residents continue to object.

See also

Coit Tower
Filbert Steps
49-Mile Scenic Drive
List of San Francisco, California Hills
The House on Telegraph Hill (1951 film)
The Sniper (1952 film)
Julius' Castle
Montgomery Street

References

External links

Surrounded by Sound: Aurally Exploring the Barbary Coast in En Fuego magazine
JB Monaco Telegraph Hill and North Beach Photo Gallery
Top 10 Animal Sightings in Non-Native Areas

Hills of San Francisco
Neighborhoods in San Francisco
San Francisco Designated Landmarks
North Beach, San Francisco